Delirium was a touring multimedia stage show by Cirque du Soleil featuring live music, video projections, and performances by acrobats and other circus performers.  The production featured remixes of existing Cirque du Soleil music. The show premiered on January 26, 2006 and had its final performance in London, England on April 20, 2008.

Delirium was the first of Cirque du Soleil's productions designed to be presented in arenas outside Japan (first was Fascination in 1992, which was only presented in Japan); all the company's previous stage productions outside Japan had been toured with their own large, custom-built tent (referred to as the 'big top' or 'grand chapiteau') or were permanent shows performed in specially designed theatres.  Delirium, as Cirque du Soleil's first significant experiment with arena venues, eventually helped pave the way for the company's subsequent show-by-show conversion of its older big top productions (e.g. Saltimbanco, Alegría, Quidam, Dralion, and Varekai) to a more cost-effective arena format.

Set and technical information 
Delirium's stage was set up on the arena floor, bisecting it lengthwise. Its two-sided, raised stage allowed for an alley theater-style presentation: the audience sat on both sides of the stage, at times able to look over the central stage to see the spectators on the other side. This presented unique staging challenges in that the most important actions had to be visible to both sides of the audience.  However, the show could also be presented as a proscenium show, with the seats on one side of the arena left empty. In this case, the stage was set up closer to the sideline opposite the occupied seats, opening up a portion of the arena floor for additional seating. Despite the extraordinary complexity and size of Delirium's stage, it could be assembled inside an arena in approximately nine hours.

The ends of the stage were flanked by enormous projection screens, where real-time video footage from the stage performance was blended with prerecorded visuals. These end screens also served to block off a backstage area for the performers and technicians.  Performers could enter the stage from behind the screens, from below (via several trap doors) and from above (via an elaborate system of motorized lifts).  Two semi-transparent screens could slide out in front of the stage to turn both sides of the stage into a massive projection surface, roughly the equivalent in width of four IMAX screens.

Unlike most other Cirque du Soleil shows, where the musicians are situated to the sides or the far upstage area and are frequently hidden from view, Delirium'''s six musicians were often in plain view, and could be seen interacting with the other performers and various stage elements.

Costumes
As the show's concept incorporated a contrast between stark urbanness and wild imagination, Michel Robidas (costume designer) drew inspiration from clothing from different eras, including the 1930s, 1960s, and 1970s, for the wanderers of the performance (i.e. the musicians), whereas bright colors and exuberance were emphasized for the acrobatic performers.  For instance, a 25-meter "volcano dress" was made from 400 meters of blue organza and represented the sea; this dress incorporated small white and red lights.  There were also purple or red and yellow whirling dervish robes, designed to look like tree roots, which started from the chest rather than the waist for a more dramatic effect.

 Music 
Much of the show's music was creatively adapted from the original scores of other Cirque du Soleil productions, but remixed with a tribal beat and lyrics added or rewritten. The Delirium soundtrack first became available for purchase on June 15, 2006 through the Cirque du Soleil Online Boutique. It features the songs of the show, but not necessarily in the order in which they were performed.

"Cold Flame" (inspired by "Oscillum" from Varekai)
"Slipping Away" (inspired by "Ombra" from Dralion)
"Someone" (inspired by "Patzivota" from Varekai)
"Too High" (inspired by "Spiritual Spiral" from Dralion)
"Walk on Water" (inspired by "A Tale" from La Nouba)
"Alone" (inspired by "Querer" from Alegría)
"Climb" (inspired by "Le Rêveur" from Varekai)
"La Nova Alegría" (inspired by Alegría's title track.)
"Lifeline" (inspired by "El Péndulo" from Varekai)
"Bridge of Sorrow" (inspired by "Nostalgie" from O)
"One Love" (inspired by "Pokinoï" from Saltimbanco)
"Let Me Fall" remixed from Quidam"Time to Go" (inspired by "Mountain of Clothes" from Alegría: The Film)
"Time Flies" (inspired by "Mer Noire" from O)
"Sans Toi" (inspired by "Querer" from Alegría)

The lead vocalists on the CD are Dessy Di Lauro, Elie Haroun, Jacynthe Millette-Bilodeau and Juliana Sheffield.

Filmography
A film version of Delirium was given a very limited theatrical release, only in theaters on October 15, 18, and 19, 2008, in the U.S. and Canada.

TourDelirium toured in arenas instead of under the grand chapiteau.  This allowed it to play in many cities for much shorter periods of time.

The following colorboxes indicate the region of each performance:  Europe  North America  South and Central America  Asia/Pacific  Oceania

Arena tour

2006 schedule
 Montréal, QC - From 26 January 2006 to 29 January 2006 (show première)''
 Albany, NY - From 3 February 2006 to 4 February 2006
 Bridgeport, CT - From 7 February 2006 to 9 February 2006
 Buffalo, NY - From 13 February 2006 to 14 February 2006
 Columbus, OH - From 17 February 2006 to 18 February 2006
 Toronto, ON - From 20 February 2006 to 21 February 2006
 Detroit, MI - From 23 February 2006 to 24 February 2006
 Indianapolis, IN - From 27 February 2006 to 28 February 2006
 Kansas City, MO - From 3 March 2006 to 4 March 2006
 Oklahoma City, OK - From 7 March 2006 to 8 March 2006
 Houston, TX - From 10 March 2006 to 12 March 2006
 Memphis, TN - From 15 March 2006 to 16 March 2006
 San Antonio, TX - From 19 March 2006 to 20 March 2006
 Little Rock, AR - From 22 March 2006 to 23 March 2006
 Dallas, TX - From 27 March 2006 to 28 March 2006
 Birmingham, AL - From 30 March 2006 to 31 March 2006
 Atlanta, GA - From 2 April 2006 to 3 April 2006
 Jacksonville, FL - From 6 April 2006 to 7 April 2006
 Tampa, FL - From 9 April 2006 to 10 April 2006
 Raleigh, NC - From 12 April 2006 to 13 April 2006
 Tallahassee, FL - From 15 April 2006 to 16 April 2006
 Orlando, FL - From 18 April 2006 to 19 April 2006
 Fort Lauderdale, FL - From 21 April 2006 to 23 April 2006
 Charlotte, NC - From 28 April 2006 to 29 April 2006
 Columbia, SC - From 2 May 2006 to 3 May 2006
 Greensboro, NC - From 6 May 2006 to 7 May 2006
 Nashville, TN - From 9 May 2006 to 10 May 2006
 St. Louis, MO - From 12 May 2006 to 13 May 2006
 Minneapolis, MN - From 16 May 2006 to 17 May 2006
 Des Moines, IA - From 19 May 2006 to 20 May 2006
 Montréal, QC - From 16 June 2006 to 18 June 2006
 Toronto, ON - From 23 June 2006 to 24 June 2006
 Pittsburgh, PA - From 29 June 2006 to 1 July 2006
 Atlantic City, NJ - From 7 July 2006 to 8 July 2006
 Baltimore, MD - From 14 July 2006 to 15 July 2006
 Worcester, MA - From 21 July 2006 to 22 July 2006
 Hartford, CT - From 29 July 2006 to 30 July 2006
 Charlottesville, VA - From 1 August 2006 to 1 August 2006
 Cleveland, OH - From 3 August 2006 to 5 August 2006
 Milwaukee, WI - From 19 August 2006 to 20 August 2006
 Grand Forks, ND - From 23 August 2006 to 23 August 2006
 Winnipeg, MB - From 25 August 2006 to 27 August 2006
 Denver, CO - From 30 August 2006 to 2 September 2006
 Las Vegas, NV - From 8 September 2006 to 9 September 2006
 Phoenix, AZ - From 11 September 2006 to 12 September 2006
 Los Angeles, CA - From 15 September 2006 to 17 September 2006
 Fresno, CA - From 19 September 2006 to 20 September 2006
 San Jose, CA - From 22 September 2006 to 24 September 2006
 Los Angeles, CA - From 27 September 2006 to 29 September 2006
 Seattle, WA - From 3 October 2006 to 4 October 2006
 Vancouver, BC - From 6 October 2006 to 7 October 2006
 Calgary, AB - From 10 October 2006 to 12 October 2006
 Edmonton, AB - From 13 October 2006 to 15 October 2006
 Portland, OR - From 19 October 2006 to 20 October 2006
 Omaha, NE - From 24 October 2006 to 25 October 2006
 Louisville, KY - From 27 October 2006 to 29 October 2006
 East Rutherford, NJ - From 3 November 2006 to 4 November 2006
 New York, NY - From 8 November 2006 to 9 November 2006
 Uniondale, NY - From 11 November 2006 to 12 November 2006
 Philadelphia, PA - From 17 November 2006 to 18 November 2006
 Hampton, VA - From 21 November 2006 to 22 November 2006
 Ottawa, ON - From 24 November 2006 to 25 November 2006

2007 schedule
 Detroit, MI - From 24 January 2007 to 27 January 2007
 Grand Rapids, MI - From 31 January 2007 to 2 February 2007
 Moline, IL - From 7 February 2007 to 8 February 2007
 Minneapolis, MN - From 9 February 2007 to 10 February 2007
 Fort Wayne, IN - From 14 February 2007 to 15 February 2007
 Chicago, IL - From 17 February 2007 to 19 February 2007
 Kansas City, MO - From 21 February 2007 to 23 February 2007
 Green Bay, WI - From 28 February 2007 to 28 February 2007
 Peoria, IL - From 1 March 2007 to 2 March 2007
 Madison, WI - From 4 March 2007 to 4 March 2007
 Indianapolis, IN - From 7 March 2007 to 9 March 2007
 Ames, IA - From 10 March 2007 to 11 March 2007
 Oklahoma City, OK - From 14 March 2007 to 16 March 2007
 Charlotte, NC - From 21 March 2007 to 22 March 2007
 Birmingham, AL - From 24 March 2007 to 25 March 2007
 Shreveport, LA - From 27 March 2007 to 27 March 2007
 Baton Rouge, LA - From 28 March 2007 to 28 March 2007
 New Orleans, LA - From 29 March 2007 to 30 March 2007
 Raleigh, NC - From 1 April 2007 to 2 April 2007
 Miami, FL - From 5 April 2007 to 7 April 2007
 San Antonio, TX - From 20 April 2007 to 21 April 2007
 Corpus Christi, TX - From 22 April 2007 to 22 April 2007
 Monterrey, MX - From 27 April 2007 to 30 April 2007
 St. Louis, MO - From 4 May 2007 to 6 May 2007
 Saskatoon, SK - From 10 May 2007 to 13 May 2007
 Spokane, WA - From 16 May 2007 to 17 May 2007
 Salt Lake City, UT - From 19 May 2007 to 20 May 2007
 San Diego, CA - From 23 May 2007 to 25 May 2007
 Phoenix, AZ - From 26 May 2007 to 27 May 2007
 Little Rock, AR - From 31 May 2007 to 31 May 2007
 Nashville, TN - From 1 June 2007 to 2 June 2007
 Greenville, SC - From 6 June 2007 to 7 June 2007
 Atlanta, GA - From 8 June 2007 to 9 June 2007
 Charleston, SC - From 10 June 2007 to 10 June 2007
 Richmond, VA - From 12 June 2007 to 13 June 2007
 Buffalo, NY - From 15 June 2007 to 17 June 2007
 Washington, DC - From 22 June 2007 to 24 June 2007
 Manchester, NH - From 26 June 2007 to 28 June 2007
 Boston, MA - From 29 June 2007 to 1 July 2007
 Rotterdam, NL - From 13 September 2007 to 15 September 2007
 Hamburg, DE - From 18 September 2007 to 19 September 2007
 Helsinki, FI - From 22 September 2007 to 24 September 2007
 Stockholm, SE - From 27 September 2007 to 29 September 2007
 Oslo, NO - From 1 October 2007 to 2 October 2007
 Mannheim, DE - From 5 October 2007 to 6 October 2007
 Manchester, UK - From 8 October 2007 to 9 October 2007
 Birmingham, UK - From 10 October 2007 to 12 October 2007
 Sheffield, UK - From 13 October 2007 to 14 October 2007
 Munich, DE - From 19 October 2007 to 20 October 2007
 Vienna, AT - From 22 October 2007 to 23 October 2007
 Prague, CZ - From 27 October 2007 to 27 October 2007
 Budapest, HU - From 30 October 2007 to 31 October 2007
 Cologne, DE - From 2 November 2007 to 3 November 2007
 Zurich, CH - From 5 November 2007 to 8 November 2007
 Pesaro, IT - From 10 November 2007 to 11 November 2007
 Milan, IT - From 13 November 2007 to 16 November 2007
 Turin, IT - From 18 November 2007 to 21 November 2007
 San Sebastian, ES - From 23 November 2007 to 24 November 2007
 Lisbon, PT - From 28 November 2007 to 2 December 2007
 Madrid, ES - From 4 December 2007 to 9 December 2007
 Valencia, ES - From 13 December 2007 to 16 December 2007
 Barcelona, ES - From 19 December 2007 to 22 December 2007

2008 schedule
 Oberhausen, DE - From 1 February 2008 to 2 February 2008
 Hanover, DE - From 5 February 2008 to 6 February 2008
 Bremen, DE - From 9 February 2008 to 10 February 2008
 Stockholm, SE - From 13 February 2008 to 14 February 2008
 Turku, FI - From 16 February 2008 to 17 February 2008
 Zurich, CH - From 25 February 2008 to 26 February 2008
 Budapest, HU - From 29 February 2008 to 1 March 2008
 Berlin, DE - From 4 March 2008 to 6 March 2008
 Nürnberg, DE - From 8 March 2008 to 9 March 2008
 Milan, IT - From 11 March 2008 to 13 March 2008
 Turin, IT - From 15 March 2008 to 17 March 2008
 Birmingham, UK - From 22 March 2008 to 23 March 2008
 Liverpool, UK - From 25 March 2008 to 26 March 2008
 Paris, FR - From 31 March 2008 to 2 April 2008
 Antwerp, BE - From 5 April 2008 to 6 April 2008
 Glasgow, UK - From 9 April 2008 to 10 April 2008
 Belfast, UK - From 12 April 2008 to 13 April 2008
 London, UK - From 18 April 2008 to 19 April 2008 (final show)

References

External links
SiouxWIRE interview with Michel Lemieux
Official Cirque du Soleil Delirium movie site

Cirque du Soleil touring shows